Leopold Rotter (born 14 September 1964) is an Austrian former professional footballer who played as a defender. He made six appearances for the Austria national team from 1991 to 1992.

References

External links
 
 

Living people
1964 births
Footballers from Vienna
Austrian footballers
Association football defenders
Austria international footballers
SK Rapid Wien players
First Vienna FC players
SKN St. Pölten players
SV Schwechat players
FC St. Veit players
Austrian Football Bundesliga players